Sirous Pourmousavi (born 27 March 1971) is an Iranian football coach and current manager of Esteghlal Khuzestan.

Statistics

Honours

Assistant manager
Esteghlal Khuzestan
Iran Pro League (1): 2015–16
Azadegan League (1): 2012–13

Manager
Esteghlal Khuzestan
Iranian Super Cup runner-up: 2016

References

Living people
1971 births
Iranian football managers
People from Ahvaz
Sportspeople from Khuzestan province
Persian Gulf Pro League managers